An Enlistment Bar is an obsolete award device of the United States Department of the Navy and United States Coast Guard which was previously awarded as an attachment to the Good Conduct Medal.  The U.S. Navy, United States Marine Corps, and United States Coast Guard were the only services to ever use enlistment bars.  An enlistment bar was similar in appearance to a campaign clasp.  The Good Conduct Loop was also a similar decoration, used by the United States Army.

Navy

The Navy first began issuing enlistment bars in 1884.  The bar was pinned to the front of the Good Conduct Medal and listed a sailor’s duty assignment at the time of the issuance of the Good Conduct Medal.  On the reverse of the enlistment bar was the sailor’s date of discharge.  In 1931, the enlistment bar was revamped to display, on the front side only, the sailor’s date of discharge for the period of Good Conduct service.

During the Second World War, enlistment bars were changed again to where the first enlistment bar would denote a subsequent decoration of the Good Conduct Medal.  Such bars were inscribed to read “SECOND AWARD”, “THIRD AWARD” and so on.

In 1950, the Navy declared enlistment bars to be obsolete and began issuing service stars to denote multiple awards of the Good Conduct Medal.

Marine Corps

The Marine Corps issued enlistment bars for subsequent awards of the Good Conduct Medal, with the front of the bar displaying the number of the subsequent enlistment and the reverse of the bar displaying the dates of the enlistment for which the Good Conduct Medal was authorized.

The Marine Corps discontinued enlistment bars in 1953 and began to use service stars to denote multiple awards of the Good Conduct Medal.

Coast Guard

Coast Guard enlistment bars were engraved in the same manner as those issued for the Navy Good Conduct Medal.  The enlistment bars originally displayed duty assignments on front, with date of discharge on the reverse.  During the Second World War, the Coast Guard followed suit with the Navy and began issuing enlistment bars engraved with the number of a subsequent Good Conduct award.  The Coast Guard maintained this system until 1966, at which time enlistment bars were declared obsolete and replaced by service stars.

See also

 Awards and decorations of the United States military

Devices and accouterments of United States military awards
1884 establishments in the United States
1950 disestablishments in the United States
Awards established in 1884
Awards disestablished in 1950